The 2001 Saint Paul mayoral election in the U.S. state of Minnesota held a scheduled primary election on 11 September and a general election on 6 November.

Incumbent mayor Norm Coleman had opted against seeking a third term.

The general election was particularly close, with Kelly winning by a mere 403 vote margin.

Candidates
Marc D. Anderson
Sharon Anderson
Jay Benavav, City Council member
Jerry Blakely
David R. Buehler
Bill Dahn
Tom Fiske
Honey M. Hervey
Bill Hosko
Bob Kessler, former administrative employee for Saint Paul mayor's office
Randy Kelly, Minnesota State Senator
Bob Long, St. Paul City Council member
Louie Lopez
Roberta "Bobbi" Megard, activist
Devin L. Miller
Maryjane Reagan

Primary 
A primary was held on September 11, from which the top two candidates would advance to the general election.

The primary coincided with the date of the September 11th terrorist attacks on the United States.

General Election Results 
Outgoing mayor Norm Coleman threw his support behind Kelly, and Kelly campaigned as a candidate that promised to continue much of Coleman's leadership style.

Kelly pledged that public safety would be his top priority, while Benavav pledged that housing would be his.

References

2001
Saint Paul
Saint Paul